The year 2008 in Australian television was the 53rd year of continuous operation.

Events 
 14 January – The Nine Network undergoes a major revamp in its production and logo and on-air graphics as a part of a new network re-launch, and after a two-year absence, returns the famous "Nine Balls" logo, except instead of balls, they use discs. It will see an overhaul of news and current affairs graphics (news graphics revised, not current affairs) and studios sets (also didn't happen) and a general on-air look.
 1 February – Former The Great Outdoors host Shelley Craft quits Channel Seven and moves to Channel Nine to join the team of Domestic Blitz and take over from Toni Pearen as host of Australia's Funniest Home Videos.
 7 February – Veteran television king Ray Martin quits the Nine Network after 30 years with the network.
 8 February – Long running Australian soap opera Neighbours airs on the BBC in the UK for the very last time after being shown for 22 years. It will switch over to air on Five on 11 February.
 12 February – The Supreme Court of Victoria places an injunction on the broadcast and exhibition of the Nine Network's drama series Underbelly in Victoria, following concerns that the series, which depicts Melbourne's gangland wars, could prejudice an ongoing murder trial.
 14 March – A Current Affair broadcasts its 5000th episode and celebrates its 20th anniversary.
 30 March – Today introduces a three-and-a-half-hour format, starting at 5.30 am and finishing at 9 am.
 3 April – Kate Ritchie (Sally Fletcher), one of the original 1988 cast members of Home and Away, leaves the series after twenty years.
 7 April – The Nine Network makes the first episodes of the new series Canal Road available for download over the Internet, ahead of its television broadcast on 16 April.
 27 April – Jack Chambers wins the first season of So You Think You Can Dance Australia.
 4 May – Kate Ritchie wins the Gold Logie Award for the Most Popular Personality on Australian Television for the second consecutive year at the 2008 Logie Awards.
 7 May – SBS TV launches a revamped version of its logo, as well as a new slogan: "Six Billion Stories and counting".
 27 May – Nine Network revived the series Wheel of Fortune under a new title of Million Dollar Wheel of Fortune and its production company Sony Pictures Television (the same company used in the US flagship counterpart, and offers a top prize of AU$1,000,000. The series shortly cancelled after five weeks of air on 27 June due to low ratings, while the same format would later be adopted in the US version three months later, with the first top prize win occurred October 14, 2008.
 2 June – The Seven Network apologises after airing an episode of the hospital drama All Saints in which it is suggested that a child born of an incestuous relationship is likely to result in the child having Down's syndrome.
 1 July – 16-year-old guitarist Smokin' Joe Robinson wins the second season of Australia's Got Talent.
 18 July – Hi-5 celebrated its 400th episode.
 21 July – The final episode of Network Ten's baddie reality show Big Brother Australia airs. The eighth and final season was won by 52-year-old grandmother Terri Munro.
 25 July – The final episode of the Nine Network's late-night news program Nightline airs after 16 years of broadcast.
 26 July – Peter Cundall's last appearance on Gardening Australia before retiring from Australian Landscapes. It goes to air on ABC1.
 3 August – The final episode of the Nine Network's flagship news and current affairs program Sunday airs. Sunday was axed by the network after 27 years of broadcast.
 26 August - Australian dramedy series Packed to the Rafters premieres on Seven Network, which broadcasts every Tuesday at 8:30 pm.
 28 August – Australia's Naughtiest Home Videos, a revival of the spin-off to Australia's Funniest Home Videos, rebadged on the Nine Network. It last time played on the network is when the late CEO, Kerry Packer banned the spin-off for life 16 years ago.
 10 October – Today Tonight draws with a final goodbye with Anna Coren in the hot-seat before heading to CNN in Hong Kong. Matt White replaced by Coren the following Monday.
 20 October – National Nine News changes its name to Nine News when it launches a new-look – losing viewers to Seven News.
 9 November – McLeod's Daughters actor Luke Jacobz and his partner Luda Kroiter win the eighth season of Dancing with the Stars.
 23 November – The sixth season of Australian Idol was won by Wes Carr.
 1 December – The Seven Network wins the ratings year for the second consecutive year, and its third overall, with a record ratings share of 28.7%. The two other commercial networks, the Nine Network (27.2%) and Network Ten (21.0%), came in second and third place respectively. The two public broadcasters, ABC1 and SBS TV, managed a ratings share of 17.5% and 5.6% respectively.
 5 December – Heather Foord presents her final weeknight bulletin on Nine News Queensland. Her final appearance wraps up a year of poor ratings for the once-leading bulletin, which lost all 40 weeks of ratings to the rival Seven News Brisbane in 2008.

Celebrity Deaths

New channels 
 7 January – Sky News Business Channel
 17 March – Nine HD
 28 April – Channel Ten Darwin
 22 June – BBC HD
 22 June – Discovery HD
 22 June – National Geographic Channel HD
 22 June – Fox Sports HD
 22 June – ESPN HD
 1 November – CBeebies
 1 November – BBC Knowledge
 1 November – 111 Hits

Ratings

Premieres

Domestic series

International series

Telemovies

Domestic telemovies

International telemovies

Miniseries

International miniseries

Documentary specials

Domestic documentary specials

International documentary specials

Specials

Programming changes

Sports broadcasting rights 
 A-League – Association football
 
 The A-League broadcasting rights were held exclusively by subscription television network Fox Sports for the 2008–09 season. Fox Sports broadcast every match of the season live-to-air, and also screened a weekly "highlights" program.

 Australian Football League (AFL) – Australian rules football
 
 The Australian Football League (AFL) broadcasting rights were jointly held by two free-to-air networks, Seven Network and Network Ten, and one subscription television network, Fox Sports, for the 2008 AFL season. Generally the eight matches per round were divided as such: Fox Sports aired four games all live-to-air (a Saturday afternoon match, a Saturday night match, a Sunday afternoon match and the Sunday twilight match), the Seven Network aired two matches delayed (the Friday night match and a Sunday afternoon match), and Network Ten aired two matches, one live-to-air and one delayed, which consisted of a Saturday afternoon and a Saturday night match respectively. The broadcast of matches may vary between networks, and broadcast times may change depending on the area of broadcast. The 2008 AFL Grand Final was broadcast live-to-air by the Seven Network, whilst Network Ten broadcast the 2008 Brownlow Medal and the 2008 NAB Cup Grand Final.

 Olympic Games
 
 The primary broadcaster of the 2008 Summer Olympics was the Seven Network, whilst complementary coverage was provided by SBS TV.

 Paralympic Games
 
 The 2008 Summer Paralympics was broadcast by the Australian Broadcasting Corporation (ABC) via ABC1 and ABC2.

See also 
 2008 in Australia
 List of Australian films of 2008

Notes

References